Glandorf is the name of the following places:

 Glandorf, Germany
 Glandorf, Ohio
 Glandorf (Kärnten), Austria